Albuca spiralis, commonly called the corkscrew albuca or frizzle sizzle, is a species of flowering plant in the family Asparagaceae, that is native to Western and Northern Cape Provinces, South Africa.

Description

The plant is recognizable by its distinctive leaves, which are narrow, spiral tipped with glandular hairs.

The plant bears nodding green flowers with pale yellow margins. The flowers are sweetly scented, with an aroma like that of vanilla.

References

 http://www.abc.net.au/gardening/stories/s2722761.htm

spiralis